Decliniidae is a family of beetles belonging to Scirtoidea. It contains the single genus Declinia with two species, D. relicta and D. versicolor, found in the Russian Far East and Japan, respectively. Little is known of their ecology, and their larvae are unknown. Specimens of D. relicta were found with pollen grains in their gut.

Species
Declinia relicta Nikitsky, Lawrence, Kirejtshuk & Gratshev, 1994
Declinia versicolor Sakai & Satô, 1996

References

Elateriformia genera
Scirtoidea